Rift Rivals (RR) was a series of cross-regional League of Legends tournaments organized by Riot Games from 2017–2019.  Rift Rivals was five concurrent tournaments where related regions would be pitted against each other.  Teams who placed the best in the Spring Split (or other opening season) of the year were invited to a tournament against another region's top teams.  In 2019 Rift Rivals, the event was narrowed to only the two largest tournaments: the LCS (NALCS) vs. the LEC (EULCS) for North America vs. Europe, and the LPL vs. LCK vs. LMS-VCS for South Korea / China / Taiwan / Vietnam.

Due to the COVID-19 pandemic, 2020 Rift Rivals was canceled by Riot, as the originally scheduled timeslot in July 2020 was replaced by a delayed Mid-Season Invitational (MSI).  Riot additionally announced it would "sunset" the tournaments.

Blue Rift 

 Europe - EU LCS (2017–2018) / LEC (2019) 
 North America - NA LCS (2017–2018) / LCS (2019)

Red Rift 

China (LPL)
 South Korea (LCK)
 Taiwan/Hong Kong/Macao (LMS) (2017–2018) / Taiwan/Hong Kong/Macao-Vietnam (LMS-VCS) (2019)

Yellow Rift 

 Brazil (BR)
 Latin America North (LAN)
 Latin America South (LAS)

Purple Rift 

 Japan (JP)
 Oceania (OCE)
 Southeast Asia (SEA)

Green Rift 

 Commonwealth of Independent States (CIS)
 Turkey (TR)
 Vietnam (VN, since 2018)

References 

League of Legends competitions